Falseuncaria kaszabi is a species of moth of the family Tortricidae. It is found in China (Gansu, Inner Mongolia, Ningxia, Qinghai, Shaanxi) and Mongolia.

References

Moths described in 1966
Cochylini